Lidsing is a hamlet and former civil parish near the M2 motorway, in the Maidstone district, in the English county of Kent. It is south of the town of Gillingham, adjacent to Bredhurst. In 1911 the parish had a population of 98.

Previously a manor/estate called Lydesinge partially in the parishes of Chatham and Gillingham, including part of the area that is now Hempstead, the district was the site of a chapel of ease, St. Mary Magdalene's, from the 12th Century. The chapel was demolished in the 1880s. Lidsing is now within the parish of Boxley.

References 

 Philip's Navigator Britain (page 92)

Hamlets in Kent
Former civil parishes in Kent
Borough of Maidstone